is the name of two post stations in Japan during the Edo period.
Akasaka-juku (Tōkaidō), the thirty-sixth station on the Tōkaidō
Akasaka-juku (Nakasendō), the fifty-sixth station on the Nakasendō